Baby Blue Pizza (sometimes Baby Blue Woodfired Pizza) was a vegan pizzeria in Portland, Oregon. The restaurant operated from July 2019 to January 2022, closing during the COVID-19 pandemic.

Description 
The restaurant served seven vegan pizzas with sourdough crusts and toppings like meatless pepperoni. Sometimes gluten-free crusts were used.

History 
Vegan chef Odie O'Connor, who previously worked at Gracie's Apizza, began operating Baby Blue as a food cart on Hawthorne Boulevard in southeast Portland in July 2019. Approximately two years later, O'Connor related the business to the Rose City Food Park. He closed the cart for approximately one month during the COVID-19 pandemic, allowing him to explore making other types of pizza and open a separate small pizzeria called Boxcar Pizza. Baby Blue closed in January 2022; employees were given the option to work at Boxcar Pizza.

Reception 
Michael Russell included Baby Blue in The Oregon's 2020 overview of Portland's five best new pizzerias. He said Baby Blue "stands out for the quality of its chewy, blistered dough" and was "leaning the charge" amongst the city's new vegan pizzerias. The Portland Business Journal gave the business a rating of 5 stars. Waz Wu included Baby Blue in Eater Portlands 2021 overview of "where to find knockout vegan pizza in Portland" and said, "This successful pop-up-turned-food-cart slings some of the most exciting vegan pizza in town." Wu also included the business in a 2021 list of 13 "vegan food carts to visit in Portland and beyond". Baby Blue was a nominee in the Best Vegan Pizzeria category of VegNews magazine's Veggie Awards in 2022.

See also 

 COVID-19 pandemic in Portland, Oregon
 Impact of the COVID-19 pandemic on the restaurant industry in the United States
 List of defunct restaurants of the United States
 List of vegetarian restaurants
 Pizza in Portland, Oregon

References

External links
 
 , KOIN

2019 establishments in Oregon
2022 disestablishments in Oregon
Defunct Italian restaurants in Portland, Oregon
Defunct pizzerias
Defunct vegan restaurants
Food carts in Portland, Oregon
Pizzerias in Portland, Oregon
Restaurants disestablished during the COVID-19 pandemic
Restaurants disestablished in 2022
Restaurants established in 2019
Vegan restaurants in Oregon